The Kinney HRH (Hot Rod Helicopter) is an American helicopter that was designed by Robert Kinney and produced by Vortech, Inc in the form of plans for amateur construction. The aircraft was first shown at Sun 'n Fun in 2002.

Design and development
The HRH was designed to comply with the US experimental – amateur-built rules. It features a single main rotor, a single-seat enclosed cockpit with a windshield, skid-type landing gear and a four-cylinder, air-cooled, four-stroke,  Subaru EJ25 automotive engine. It is the high power to weight ratio that gives the aircraft its name.

The aircraft fuselage is made from a mix of welded 4130 steel tube and bolted-together aluminum tubing, with a composite cabin shell. The tail rotor has a  diameter.

Operational history
By January 2013 there was one example, the 2001 prototype, registered in the United States with the Federal Aviation Administration.

Specifications (HRH)

References

External links

2000s United States sport aircraft
2000s United States helicopters
Homebuilt aircraft
Single-engined piston helicopters